"Do What U Like" is the debut single by English boy band Take That. It was released on 22 July 1991 as the lead single from their debut studio album, Take That & Party (1992).

Background
The song was written by Gary Barlow and Ray Hedges, and it was produced by Hedges with additional production by Graham Stack. "Do What U Like" was released on 15 July 1991 as the lead single from Take That's debut album Take That & Party (1992). The single was released on then-manager Nigel Martin-Smith's record label Dance U.K. and distributed by BMG (to which, through RCA Records division, later signed). The song was the only single not to be included on the band's second greatest hits compilation, Never Forget – The Ultimate Collection (2005).

Originally released only on 7" and 12" vinyl records and as cassette single, it received a CD single reissue in 1992, from their at-time home label RCA Records, only in Australia.

Critical reception

In 2012, the Daily Mirror retrospectively commented, "Looking back, it's almost inconceivable that the skinny wannabes cavorting around in the video covered in jelly and custard – including 17-year-old schoolboy Robbie Williams – would go on to become one of the biggest phenomenons in British pop history."

Reaction to the song and video among the bandmates has been somewhat negative. In the documentary Take That: For the Record, Barlow admits that neither the song nor video were brilliant, but they were important in helping the band getting noticed.

In concert
During the band's early television appearances and outdoor shows, the song was a recurring number to play. They performed it during the "Pops" tour with Mini-Take That, a preteen group that sang the material of the band.

For the "Nobody Else", and the subsequent "Ultimate Tour 2006" and "Beautiful World Tour 2007", the song was never played, because the band members felt that the high energy dance choreography was not possible for them to do. However, during Take That Present: The Circus Live, it was included in a medley of their earliest singles from Take That and Party with Jason and Howard performing the complicated moves and classic routines for "Promises", "It Only Takes a Minute" and "Take That and Party".

Music video
The low-budget music video for "Do What U Like", co-directed by former BBC Radio 1 DJ and The Old Grey Whistle Test presenter Rosemary "Ro" Barratt (née Newton) and MTV Europe director Angie Smith, was shot at Vector Television studios in Heaton Mersey on 21 June 1991. Featuring the band getting naked, bare buttocks and smearing jelly over themselves, the video was banned from daytime television, and at the time was only shown on Pete Waterman's late night show The Hitman and Her.

The video (like the song was from the album) was also omitted from the 2005 video compilation Never Forget – The Ultimate Collection. Otherwise, it became available in digital distribution, streaming services and on band's official YouTube channel.

Personnel
Gary Barlow – lead vocals
Howard Donald – backing vocals
Jason Orange – backing vocals
Mark Owen – backing vocals
Robbie Williams – backing vocals

Track listings
Austrian CD single (CDDUK2)
 "Do What U Like" (Club Mix) – 6:14
 "Do What U Like" (Radio Mix) – 3:06
 "Waiting Around" – 2:56

UK 7" vinyl (DUK2)
 "Do What U Like" (Radio Mix) – 3:06
 "Waiting Around" – 2:56

UK cassette (CADUK2)
 "Do What U Like" (Radio Mix) – 3:06
 "Waiting Around" – 2:56

UK 12" vinyl (12DUK2)
 "Do What U Like" (Club Mix) – 6:14
 "Do What U Like" (Radio Mix) – 3:06
 "Waiting Around" – 2:56

Charts

Official versions
 Radio mix (3:06)
 Club mix (6:15)
 12" mix (5:06)

References

1991 debut singles
1991 songs
Take That songs
Songs written by Gary Barlow
Songs written by Ray Hedges
Song recordings produced by Ray Hedges
Song recordings produced by Graham Stack (record producer)